François Porché (born Cognac, November 21, 1877 - died Vichy, April 19, 1944) was a French dramatist, poet and literary critic. The French Academy awarded him the Grand Prix de Literature in 1923. Les Butors et la Finette, a "symbolical and allegorical drama" premiered in 1917, Sam Abramovitch in 1927 (in New York City) and Un roi, deux dames et un valet in 1934. He published a war poem L' Arret sur la Marne in 1916 and a poetry collection called Charles Baudelaire in memory of the poet.

Selected works

À chaque jour (1904)
Les Suppliants (1905)
Au loin, peut-être… (1909)
Humus et poussière (1911)
Prisme étrange de la maladie (1912)
Le Dessous du masque (1914)
Nous (1914)
L'Arrêt sur la Marne (1916)
Le Poème de la tranchée (1916)
Les Butors et la Finette (1917)
 La Jeune Fille aux joues roses, Théâtre Sarah Bernhardt
 Soumission à la Vénus d'Arles, poème (9 pages), Mercure de France. N° 547, 1er avril 1921
La Dauphine, comédie en 3 actes (1922)
Sonates (1923)
Le Chevalier de Colomb, drame en 3 actes (1923)
Visite aux Canadiens français (1924)
Chez nos frères du Canada (1925)
Qu’est-ce que l’âme slave ? (1925)
 La Vierge au grand cœur, ou la Mission, les travaux et la passion de Jeanne d'Arc, pièce en 3 parties et 8 tableaux, mise en scène Simone Le Bargy, Théâtre de la Renaissance, 27 
Paul Valéry et la poésie pure (1926)
La Vie douloureuse de Charles Baudelaire (1926)
Sam Abramovitch (1927)
L'amour qui n'ose pas dire son nom (1927)
L'Evolution poétique de M. Henri de Régnier (1928)
Humoristes, cubistes et surréalistes (1928)
Mirages de l'Argent (1929)
Poètes français depuis Verlaine (1929)
Tsar Lénine, mystère en trois actes et un épilogue (1930)
Les Dernières Années de Verlaine (1932)
Franc-Nohain poète ou l'esprit des choses (1932)
La Jeunesse bourgeoise de Paul Verlaine (1932)
La Race errante, drame en 3 actes et 6 tableaux, (1932)
Tristan Bernard, auteur classique (1932)
La Crise du théâtre (1933)
Verlaine et sa vieille mère (1933)
Verlaine tel qu'il fut (1933)
La Jeunesse de Léon Tolstoï (1935)
Orage sur la Comédie-Française (1935)
Portrait psychologique de Tolstoï (de la naissance à la mort), 1828-1910 (1935)
Un roi, deux dames et un valet, pièce en 4 actes : d'après un récit inédit de Mme Simone (1935), Comédie des Champs-Elysées, 1934
Baudelaire : histoire d'une âme (1944)

References

20th-century French dramatists and playwrights
French poets
French literary critics
People from Cognac, France
1877 births
1944 deaths
20th-century French poets